Balvantsinh Rajput is an Indian politician businessman and cabinet minister of Industries, Civil Aviation, Rural Development, Labour and Employment in the Government of Gujarat. He joined the Bharatiya Janata Party in 2017 after leaving Indian National Congress before the Rajya Sabha election.

Career 
During the Gujarat Assembly election of 2012 Rajput who belonged to the Indian National Congress party declared assets worth 2680 million rupees ($41 million). In the election, he defeated Jay Narayan Vyas of the Bharatiya Janata Party from the Sidhpur seat.

On 28 July 2017, Rajput along with two other Congress legislators resigned from the assembly and joined the Bharatiya Janata Party in the presence of party president Amit Shah ahead of the Rajya Sabha election (Election to Upper House of Indian Parliament). It was announced that he was nominated by his new party as a candidate from the state's third seat.
He was congratulated by chief minister Vijay Rupani.

References 

Living people
Gujarat MLAs 2012–2017
Indian National Congress politicians
1962 births